Nocardia asteroides is a species of Nocardia. It can cause nocardiosis, a severe pulmonary infection in immunocompromised hosts.

References

Further reading

External links
Type strain of Nocardia asteroides at BacDive -  the Bacterial Diversity Metadatabase

Mycobacteriales
Bacteria described in 1891